Bali Nyonga is a town in the Northwest Region of the country Cameroon on the West Central borders on the continent of Africa. It is the home of the Bali Nyonga, a people of the Chamba Leko group - an entity that migrated from Chamba around 1600. Their language is known as mungaka.

External links
 Bali Cultural Association
 Ethnologue

References

Populated places in Northwest Region (Cameroon)